Mirovka is a rural locality (a selo) in Rostashevskoye Rural Settlement, Paninsky District, Voronezh Oblast, Russia. The population was 67 as of 2010. There are 2 streets.

Geography 
Mirovka is located 13 km southwest of Panino (the district's administrative centre) by road. Rostashevka is the nearest rural locality.

References 

Rural localities in Paninsky District